There were six special elections to the United States House of Representatives in 1885 during the 48th and 49th Congresses.

48th Congress 

|-
| 
| Alfred M. Scales
|  | Democratic
| 18571858 1874
|  | Incumben resigned December 30, 1884 when elected Governor of North Carolina.New member elected January 15, 1885.Democratic hold.Successor seated January 28, 1885.Winner was already elected to the next term.
| nowrap | 

|-
| 
| Jonathan Chace
|  | Republican
| 1880
| Resigned January 26, 1885 when elected U.S. Senator.New member elected February 5, 1885.Democratic hold.Successor seated February 12, 1885.Winner was already elected to the next term.
| nowrap | 

|}

49th Congress 

|-
| 
| James K. Jones
|  | Democratic
| 1880
| Incumbent member-elect resigned during the previous Congress when elected U.S. senator.New member elected September 7, 1885.Democratic hold.Successor seated December 7, 1885.
| nowrap | 

|-
| 
| Reuben Ellwood
|  | Republican
| 1882
|  | Incumbent died July 1, 1885.New member elected November 3, 1885.Republican hold.Successor seated December 7, 1885.
| nowrap | 

|-
| 
| Samuel S. Cox
|  | Democratic
| 1856 1864 1868 
|  | Incumbent resigned to become U.S. Envoy Extraordinary and Minister Plenipotentiary to the Ottoman Empire.New member elected November 3, 1885.Democratic hold.
| nowrap | 

|-
| 
| William A. Duncan
|  | Democratic
| 1882
|  | Incumbent member-elected resigned during previous congress.New member elected November 3, 1885.Democratic hold.Successor seated December 7, 1885.
| nowrap | 

|}

References 

 
1885